Kevin Stenlund (born 20 September 1996) is a Swedish professional ice hockey forward. He is currently playing with the  Winnipeg Jets of the National Hockey League (NHL). Stenlund was drafted by the Columbus Blue Jackets, 58th overall, in the 2015 NHL Entry Draft.

Playing career
Stenlund made his Swedish Hockey League debut playing with HV71 during the 2014–15 SHL season. On 30 May 2015, Stenlund was signed to a two-year first team contract extension to remain with HV71.

On 23 May 2017 Stenlund signed his first NHL contract, agreeing to a three-year, entry-level deal with the Columbus Blue Jackets. In the 2017–18 season, he was returned on loan to continue his development in the SHL with HV71. Stenlund eclipsed his previous points totals in recording 15 assists and 22 points in 43 games before suffering an early exit with the club in the Wild Card round. Having completed the season with HV71, Stenlund was re-assigned to play out the remainder of the season with the Blue Jackets AHL affiliate, the Cleveland Monsters, on 17 March 2018.

On 17 June 2021, Stenlund re-signed with the Blue Jackets on a one-year contract.

As a free agent after five seasons within the Blue Jackets organization, Stenlund was signed to a one-year, two-way contract with the Winnipeg Jets on 13 July 2022.

Career statistics

Awards and honors

References

External links

1996 births
Living people
Cleveland Monsters players
Columbus Blue Jackets draft picks
Columbus Blue Jackets players
HV71 players
Manitoba Moose players
Ice hockey people from Stockholm
Swedish ice hockey centres
Västerviks IK players
HC Vita Hästen players
Winnipeg Jets players